Meinhof is a surname. Notable people with the surname include:

Carl Meinhof (1857–1944), German linguist
Ulrike Meinhof (1934–1976), West German left-wing militant, co-founder of the Red Army Faction, daughter of Werner
Ulrike Hanna Meinhof, professor and Chair of Cultural Studies at the University of Bradford
Werner Meinhof (1901–1940), German historian, brother of Carl

See also
Baader-Meinhof (disambiguation)